Edgar Cesáreo Navarro Sánchez (born 21 May 1971) is a Paralympic athlete from Mexico competing mainly in category T51 wheelchair racing events.

Navarro has competed in four Paralympics across two sports. His first sport was athletics where he competed in the 2000 Summer Paralympics as a T51 athlete in 200m, 400m and 800m.  In 2004 he won the 200m and a bronze medal in the marathon before in 2008 moving to cycling where he competed in the individual time trial for hand cycles class A. In 2012 he appeared in his fourth Paralympics where he finished fourth in the T51 100m sprint at London.

Four years later he eared two medals in Rio 2016: One silver in 400 meters and one bronze in 100 meters.

References

External links 
 

Living people
1971 births
Paralympic athletes of Mexico
Paralympic cyclists of Mexico
Athletes (track and field) at the 2000 Summer Paralympics
Athletes (track and field) at the 2004 Summer Paralympics
Athletes (track and field) at the 2012 Summer Paralympics
Cyclists at the 2008 Summer Paralympics
Paralympic gold medalists for Mexico
Paralympic bronze medalists for Mexico
Medalists at the 2004 Summer Paralympics
Paralympic medalists in athletics (track and field)
Athletes (track and field) at the 2020 Summer Paralympics
People from Nezahualcóyotl
Sportspeople from the State of Mexico
Mexican male wheelchair racers
21st-century Mexican people